Clovis (– 27 November 511) was the first king of the Franks to unite all of the Frankish tribes under one ruler, changing the form of leadership from a group of petty kings to rule by a single king and ensuring that the kingship was passed down to his heirs. He is considered to have been the founder of the Merovingian dynasty, which ruled the Frankish kingdom for the next two centuries.

Clovis succeeded his father, Childeric I, as a king of Salian Franks in 481, and eventually came to rule an area extending from what is now the southern Netherlands to northern France, corresponding in Roman terms to Gallia Belgica (northern Gaul). At the Battle of Soissons (486) he established his military dominance of the rump state of the fragmenting Western Roman Empire which was then under the command of Syagrius. By the time of his death in either 511 or 513, Clovis had conquered several smaller Frankish kingdoms in the northeast of Gaul including some northern parts of what is now France. Clovis also conquered the Alemanni tribes in eastern Gaul, and the Visigothic kingdom of Aquitania in the southwest. These campaigns added significantly to Clovis's domains, and established his dynasty as a major political and military presence in western Europe.

Clovis is important in the historiography of France as "the first king of what would become France".

Clovis is also significant due to his conversion to Catholicism in 496, largely at the behest of his wife, Clotilde, who would later be venerated as a saint for this act, celebrated today in both the Roman Catholic Church and Eastern Orthodox Church. Clovis was baptized on Christmas Day in 508. The adoption by Clovis of Catholicism (as opposed to the Arianism of most other Germanic tribes) led to widespread conversion among the Frankish peoples; to religious unification across what is now modern-day France, the Low Countries and Germany; three centuries later, to Charlemagne's alliance with the Bishop of Rome; and in the middle of the 10th century under Otto I the Great, to the consequent birth of the early Holy Roman Empire.

Name 

Based on the attested forms, the original name is reconstructed in the Frankish language as *Hlōdowik or *Hlōdowig and is traditionally considered to be composed of two elements, deriving from both Proto-Germanic: *hlūdaz ("loud, famous") and *wiganą ("to battle, to fight"), resulting in the traditional practice of translating Clovis' name as meaning "famous warrior" or "renowned in battle".

However, scholars have pointed out that Gregory of Tours consequently transcribes the names of various Merovingian royal names containing the first element as chlodo-. The use of a close-mid back protruded vowel (o), rather than the expected close back rounded vowel (u) which Gregory does use in various other Germanic names (i.e. Fredegundis, Arnulfus, Gundobadus, etc.) opens up the possibility that the first element instead derives from Proto-Germanic *hlutą ("lot, share, portion"), giving the meaning of the name as "loot bringer" or "plunder (bringing) warrior". This hypothesis is supported by the fact that if the first element is taken to mean "famous", then the name of Chlodomer (one of Clovis' sons) would contain two elements (*hlūdaz and *mērijaz) both meaning "famous", which would be highly uncommon within the typical Germanic name structure.

In Middle Dutch, a language closely related to Frankish, the name was rendered as Lodewijch (cf. modern Dutch Lodewijk). The name is found in other West Germanic languages, with cognates including Old English Hloðwig, Old Saxon Hluduco, and Old High German Hludwīg (variant Hluotwīg). The latter turned into Ludwig in Modern German, although the king Clovis himself is generally named Chlodwig. The Old Norse form Hlǫðvér was most likely borrowed from a West Germanic language.

The Frankish name *Hlodowig is at the origin of the French given name Louis (variant Ludovic), borne by 18 kings of France, via the Latinized form Hludovicus (variants Ludhovicus, Lodhuvicus, or Chlodovicus). The English Lewis stems from the Anglo-French Louis. In Spanish, the name became Luis, in Italian Luigi (variants Ludovico and Venetian Alvise, rarer Aligi and Aloisio), and in Hungarian Lajos.

Background
Clovis was the son of Childeric I, a Merovingian king of the Salian Franks, and Basina, a Thuringian princess. The dynasty he founded is, however, named after his supposed ancestor, Merovich. Clovis succeeded his father to become king at the age of 15 in 481, as deduced from Gregory of Tours placing the Battle of Tolbiac (Zülpich) in the fifteenth year of Clovis's reign.

Numerous small Frankish petty kingdoms existed during the 5th century. The Salian Franks were the first-known Frankish tribe that settled with official Roman permission within the empire, first in Batavia in the Rhine-Maas delta, and then in 375 in Toxandria, which in the present day consists of the province of North Brabant in the Netherlands and parts of neighbouring provinces of Antwerp and Limburg in Belgium. This put them in the north part of the Roman civitas Tungrorum, with Romanized population still dominant south of the military highway Boulogne-Cologne. Later, Chlodio seems to have attacked westwards from this area to take control of the Roman populations in Tournai, then southwards to Artois, and Cambrai, eventually controlling an area stretching to the Somme river.

Childeric I, Clovis's father, was reputed to be a relative of Chlodio, and was known as the king of the Franks that fought as an army within northern Gaul. In 463 he fought in conjunction with Aegidius, the magister militum of northern Gaul, to defeat the Visigoths in Orléans. Childeric died in 481 and was buried in Tournai; Clovis succeeded him as king, aged just 15. Historians believe that Childeric and Clovis were both commanders of the Roman military in the Province of Belgica Secunda and were subordinate to the magister militum. The Franks of Tournai came to dominate their neighbours, initially aided by the association with Aegidius.

The death of Flavius Aetius in 454 led to the decline of imperial power in the Gaul; leaving the Visigoths and the Burgundians competing for predominance in the area. The part of Gaul still under Roman control emerged as a kingdom under Syagrius, Aegidius's son.

Though no primary sources expounding on the language spoken by Clovis exist, historical linguist consider it likely that, based on his family history and core territories, he spoke a form of Old Dutch. In this, the early Merovingians can be contrasted with the later Carolingians, such as Charlemagne, of the late 8th century and onward, who probably spoke various forms of Old High German.

Early reign (481–491)

Road to Soissons

The ruler of Tournai died in 481 and was succeeded by his sixteen-year-old son, Clovis. His band of warriors probably numbered no more than half a thousand. In 486 he began his efforts to expand the realm by allying himself with his relative, Ragnachar, regulus of Cambrai and another Frankish regulus, Chalaric. Together the triumvirate marched against Syagrius and met the Gallo-Roman commander at Soissons. During the battle Chalaric betrayed his comrades by refusing to take part in the fighting. Despite the betrayal, the Franks landed a decisive victory, forcing Syagrius to flee to the court of Alaric II. This battle is viewed as bringing about the end of the rump state of the Western Roman Empire outside of Italy. Following the battle, Clovis invaded the traitor Chararic's territory and was able to imprison him and his son.

Taming Gaul

Prior to the battle, Clovis did not enjoy the support of the Gallo-Roman clergy, so he proceeded to pillage the Roman territory, including the churches. The Bishop of Reims requested Clovis return everything taken from the Church of Reims, and, as the young king aspired to establish cordial relationships with the clergy, he returned a valuable ewer taken from the church. Despite his position, some Roman cities refused to yield to the Franks, namely Verdun‒which surrendered after a brief siege‒and Paris, which stubbornly resisted a few years, perhaps as many as five. He made Paris his capital and established an abbey dedicated to Saints Peter and Paul on the south bank of the Seine.

Clovis came to the realisation that he wouldn't be able to rule Gaul without the help of the clergy and aimed to please the clergy by taking a Catholic wife. He also integrated many of Syagrius's units into his own army. The Roman kingdom was probably under Clovis's control by 491, because in the same year Clovis successfully moved against a small number of Thuringians in the eastern Gaul, near the Burgundian border.

Middle reign (492–506)

Barbarian bonding

Around 493 AD, he secured an alliance with the Ostrogoths through the marriage of his sister Audofleda to their king, Theodoric the Great.
In the same year, the neighboring King of the Burgundians was slain by his brother, Gundobad; bringing civil strife to that kingdom. He proceeded to drown his sister-in-law and force his niece, Chrona, into a convent; another niece, Clotilde, fled to the court of her other uncle. Finding himself in a precarious position this uncle, Godegisel, decided to ally himself to Clovis by marrying his exiled niece to the Frankish king.

Assault of the Alamanni

In 496, the Alamanni invaded and some Salians and Ripuarians reguli defected to their side. Clovis met his enemies near the strong fort of Tolbiac. During the fighting, the Franks suffered heavy losses. Clovis, together with over three thousand Frankish companions, may have converted to Christianity around this time. With the help of the Ripuarian Franks he narrowly defeated the Alamanni in the Battle of Tolbiac in 496. Now Christian, Clovis confined his prisoners, Chararic and his son, to a monastery.

Business in Burgundy

In 500 or 501, the relationship between the Burgundian brothers took a turn for the worse when Godegisel began scheming against his brother Gundobad. He promised his brother-in-law territory and annual tribute for defeating his brother. Clovis was eager to subdue the political threat to his realm and crossed to the Burgundian territory. After hearing about the incident, Gundobad moved against Clovis and called his brother. The three armies met near Dijon, where both the Franks and Godegisel's forces defeated the host of the dumbfounded Gundobad, who escaped to Avignon. Clovis proceeded to follow the Burgundian king and laid siege to the city; however, after some months, he was convinced to abandon the siege and settled for an annual tribute from Gundobad.

Armonici allies
In 501, 502 or 503, Clovis led his troops to Armorica. He had previously restricted of his operations to minor raids, yet this time, the goal was subjugation. Clovis failed to complete his objective via military means; therefore, he was constrained to statecraft, which proved fruitful, for the Armonici shared Clovis's disdain for the Arian Visigoths. Armorica and its fighters were thus integrated into the Frankish realm.

Late reign (507–511)

Visiting the Visigoths

In 507 Clovis was allowed by the magnates of his realm to invade the remaining threat of the Kingdom of the Visigoths. King Alaric had previously tried to establish a cordial relationship with Clovis by serving him the head of exiled Syagrius on a silver plate in 486 or 487. However, Clovis was no longer able to resist the temptation to move against the Visigoths, for many Catholics under Visigoth yoke were unhappy and implored Clovis to make a move. But just to be absolutely certain about retaining the loyalties of the Catholics under Visigoths, Clovis ordered his troops to omit raiding and plunder, for this was not a foreign invasion, but a liberation.

Armonici assisted him in defeating the Visigothic kingdom of Toulouse in the Battle of Vouillé in 507, eliminating Visigothic power in Gaul. The battle added most of Aquitaine to Clovis's kingdom and resulted in the death of the Visigothic king Alaric II.

According to Gregory of Tours, following the battle the Byzantine Emperor Anastasius I made Clovis a patrician and honorary consul.

Ravishing the Reguli
In 507, following Vouillé, Clovis heard about Chararic's plan to escape from his monastic prison and had him murdered.

In the same year, Clovis convinced Prince Chlodoric to murder his father, earning him his nickname as Chlodoric the Parricide. Following the murder, Clovis betrayed Chlodoric and had his envoys strike him down.

In 509, Clovis visited his old ally, Ragnachar in Cambrai. Following his conversion, many of his pagan retainers had defected to Ragnachar's side, making him a political threat. Ragnachar denied Clovis's entry, prompting Clovis to make a move against him. He bribed Ragnachar's retainers and soon, Ragnachar and his brother, Ricchar were captured and executed.

Death

Shortly before his death, Clovis called a synod of Gallic bishops to meet in Orléans to reform the Church and create a strong link between the Crown and the Catholic episcopate. This was the First Council of Orléans. Thirty-three bishops assisted and passed 31 decrees on the duties and obligations of individuals, the right of sanctuary, and ecclesiastical discipline. These decrees, equally applicable to Franks and Romans, first established equality between conquerors and conquered.

Clovis I is traditionally said to have died on 27 November 511; however, the Liber Pontificalis suggests that he was still alive in 513, so the exact date of his death is not known. After his death, Clovis was laid to rest in the Abbey of St Genevieve in Paris. His remains were relocated to Saint Denis Basilica in the mid- to late 18th century.

When Clovis died, his kingdom was partitioned among his four sons, Theuderic, Chlodomer, Childebert and Clotaire. This partition created the new political units of the Kingdoms of Rheims, Orléans, Paris and Soissons, and inaugurated a tradition that would lead to disunity lasting until the end of the Merovingian dynasty in 751. Clovis had been a king with no fixed capital and no central administration beyond his entourage. By deciding to be interred at Paris, Clovis gave the city symbolic weight. When his grandchildren divided royal power 50 years after his death in 511, Paris was kept as a joint property and a fixed symbol of the dynasty.

The disunity continued under the Carolingians until, after a brief unity under Charlemagne, the Franks splintered into distinct spheres of cultural influence that coalesced around Eastern and Western centers of royal power. These later political, linguistic, and cultural entities became the Kingdom of France, the myriad German States, and the semi-autonomous kingdoms of Burgundy and Lotharingia.

Baptism

Clovis was born a pagan but later became interested in converting to Arian Christianity, whose followers believed that Jesus was a distinct and separate being from God the Father, both subordinate to and created by him. This contrasted with Nicene Christianity, whose followers believe that God the Father, Jesus, and the Holy Spirit are three persons of one being (consubstantiality). While the theology of the Arians was declared a heresy at the First Council of Nicea in 325, the missionary work of Bishop Ulfilas converted a significant portion of the pagan Goths to Arian Christianity in the 4th century. By the time of the ascension of Clovis, Gothic Arians dominated Christian Gaul, and Catholics were in the minority.

Clovis's wife Clotilde, a Burgundian princess, was a Catholic despite the Arianism that surrounded her at court. Her persistence eventually persuaded Clovis to convert to Catholicism, which he initially resisted. Clotilde had wanted her son to be baptized, but Clovis refused, so she had the child baptized without Clovis's knowledge. Shortly after his baptism, their son died, which further strengthened Clovis's resistance to conversion. Clotilde also had their second son baptized without her husband's permission, and this son became ill and nearly died after his baptism. Clovis eventually converted to Catholicism following the Battle of Tolbiac on Christmas Day 508 in a small church in the vicinity of the subsequent Abbey of Saint-Remi in Reims; a statue of his baptism by Saint Remigius can still be seen there. The details of this event have been passed down by Gregory of Tours, who recorded them many years later in the 6th century.

The king's Catholic baptism was of immense importance in the subsequent history of Western and Central Europe in general, as Clovis expanded his dominion over almost all of Gaul. Catholicism offered certain advantages to Clovis as he fought to distinguish his rule among many competing power centers in Western Europe. His conversion to the Roman Catholic form of Christianity served to set him apart from the other Germanic kings of his time, such as those of the Visigoths and the Vandals, who had converted from Germanic paganism to Arian Christianity. His embrace of the Roman Catholic faith may have also gained him the support of the Catholic Gallo-Roman aristocracy in his later campaign against the Visigoths, which drove them from southern Gaul in 507 and resulted in a great many of his people converting to Catholicism as well.

On the other hand, Bernard Bachrach has argued that his conversion from Frankish paganism alienated many of the other Frankish sub-kings and weakened his military position over the next few years. William Daly, more directly assessing Clovis's allegedly barbaric and pagan origins, ignored the Gregory of Tours version and based his account on the scant earlier sources, a sixth-century  of Saint Genevieve and letters to or concerning Clovis from bishops (now in the ) and Theodoric.

Clovis and his wife were buried in the Abbey of St Genevieve (St. Pierre) in Paris; the original name of the church was the Church of the Holy Apostles.

Roman law 

Under Clovis, the first codification of the Salian Frank law took place. The Roman Law was written with the assistance of Gallo-Romans to reflect the Salic legal tradition and Christianity, while containing much from Roman tradition. The Roman Law lists various crimes as well as the fines associated with them.

Legacy
The legacy of Clovis's conquests, a Frankish kingdom that included most of Roman Gaul and parts of western Germany, survived long after his death. To the French people, he is the founder of France.

Detracting, perhaps, from this legacy, is his aforementioned division of the state. This was done not along national or even largely geographical lines, but primarily to assure equal income amongst his sons after his death. While it may or may not have been his intention, this division was the cause of much internal discord in Gaul. This precedent led in the long run to the fall of his dynasty, for it was a pattern repeated in future reigns. Clovis did bequeath to his heirs the support of both people and Church such that, when the magnates were ready to do away with the royal house, the sanction of the Pope was sought first.

By his conversion to Christianity he made himself the ally of the papacy and its protector as well as that of the people, who were mostly Catholics.

Sainthood 

In later centuries, Clovis was venerated as a saint in France. The Benedictine Abbey of Saint-Denis (where Clovis was buried) had a shrine to St. Clovis to the east of the main altar. There was also a shrine to him in the Abbey of Saint Genevieve in Paris. This shrine had a statue and a number of epitaphs and was probably where the veneration of St. Clovis began. Despite Clovis's presence in Paris, his cultus was largely based in the south of France. Abbot Aymeric de Peyrat (d. 1406), the author of the History of the Moissac Abbey, claimed that his own monastery was founded by St. Clovis and there were many monasteries named in his honour. Aymeric not only referred to Clovis as a saint but also prayed for St. Clovis's intercession. There were also known to be shrines dedicated to Clovis in Église Sainte-Marthe de Tarascon and Saint-Pierre-du-Dorât. Boniface Symoneta, Jacques Almain and Paulus Aemilius Veronensis gave hagiographic accounts of Clovis's life and at the time it was common to include Clovis's life in collections of the lives of the saints.

It has been suggested that the reason that the French state promoted the veneration of Clovis in the south was to establish a border cult that would cause Occitans to venerate the northern-led French state by venerating its founder. Another reason could be that Clovis was a preferable foundation figure for the House of Valois as their predecessors were the Direct Capetians who looked back to Charlemagne whose veneration had been widely recognised. In contrast to the theory of St. Clovis's cult being a primarily northern-supported movement, Amy Goodrich Remensnyder suggests that St. Clovis was used by Occitans to reject the northern concept of the monarchy and to reinstate their autonomy as something granted by the saint.

St. Clovis had the role of a more militarised royal saint than the pious Louis IX of France. As a saint, Clovis was important as he represented the spiritual birth of the nation and provided a chivalrous and ascetic model for French political leaders to follow. The veneration of St. Clovis was not exclusive to France as a print by the Holy Roman woodcut designer Leonhard Beck made for the Habsburg monarchs depicts Clovis as St. Chlodoveus, St. Boniface's Abbey in Munich depicted St. Chlodoveus as a saint worthy of emulation because of his advocacy, and the Florentine Baroque painter Carlo Dolci painted a large depiction of St. Clovis for the Imperial Apartment in the Uffizi Gallery.

St. Clovis had no known official canonisation, neither was he beatified, so his sainthood was only ever recognised by popular acclaim. Following the example of the monks of St. Geneviève, St. Clovis's feast day in France was held on 27 November. St. Clovis enjoyed a persistent campaign from French royal authorities that few non-French national or dynastic saints did. French monarchs, beginning in the 14th century at the latest, attempted to officially canonise Clovis a number of times. The most notable attempt, led by King Louis XI and modelled on the successful canonisation campaign of Louis IX, occurred during a conflict with the Burgundians. The cause for Clovis's canonisation was taken up once again in the 17th century, with Jesuit support, a vita and an account of posthumous miracles, in opposition to the controversial historical works of Calvinist pastor Jean de Serres who portrayed Clovis as a cruel and bloodthirsty king.

The Jesuit attempt to formally canonize Clovis came after a rediscovery of Clovis's cultus in the 16th century. During this period, the dual role St. Clovis could have for modern France was clarified as that of a deeply sinful man who attained sainthood by submitting himself to the will of God, as well as being the founder of the Gallican Church. He also attained an essentially mystic reputation. St. Clovis role in calling for the First Council of Orléans was understood to be strongly Gallican as he called it without Papal authority and with the understanding that he and his bishops had the authority to call councils that were binding for the Frankish people. For Protestant Gallicans, St. Clovis represented the role of the monarchy in governing the Church and curbing its abuses and was contrasted positively against the Papacy of his time. Protestants were unlikely to mention any of the miracles attributed to St. Clovis, sometimes even writing lengthy rejections of their existence. Instead, they saw his sainthood as evident from his creation of a state more holy and Christian than that of Rome.

Catholic writers in the 16th century expanded upon the lists of St. Clovis's attributed miracles, but in the early 17th century they also began to minimize their use of the miraculous elements of his hagiography. Mid-to-late-17th-century Jesuit writers resisted this trend and allowed for no doubt as to the miraculous nature of St. Clovis life or his sainthood. Jesuit writers stressed the more extreme elements of his hagiography, and that of other saints associated with him, even claiming that St. Remigius lived for five hundred years. These hagiographies would still be quoted and widely believed as late as 1896, the fourteenth centenary of his baptism, as a speech from Cardinal Langénieux demonstrates. Another factor that led to a resurgence in St. Clovis's veneration was the Spanish Monarchy's use of the title Catholic Monarchs, a title French Monarchs hoped to usurp by attributing it to the much earlier figure of St. Clovis.

Chronology

 c. 466: Clovis is born in Tournai.
 c. 467: Clovis's sister, Audofleda is born.
 c. 468: Clovis's sister, Lenteild is born.
 c. 470: Clovis's sister Albofledis is born.
 c. 477: Clovis's mother Basina dies.
 c. 481: Clovis's father Childeric I dies and is succeeded by Clovis.
 c. 486: Clovis defeats Syagrius in Soissons and begins the takeover of the kingdom.
 c. 487: Clovis's son Theuderic I is born.
 c. 491: Clovis completes the conquest of the kingdom and turns his attention elsewhere.
 c. 493:Clovis marries Audofleda to Theoderic the Great.Clovis marries a Burgundian princess, Clotilde.
 c. 494: Clovis's and Clotilde's first child, Ingomer is born and dies.
 c. 495:Clovis's and Clotilde's second son Chlodomer is born.Clovis becomes an uncle as Audofleda gives birth to an Ostrogothic princess, Amalasuntha.
 c. 496:Clovis is baptised (early estimate)Clovis defeats the Alamanni threat.Clovis's and Clotilde's third son Childebert I is born.
 c. 497. Clovis's and Clotilde's fourth son Chlothar I is born.
 c. 500:Clovis subjugates Burgundy.Clovis's and Clotilde's only daughter Clotilde is born.Albofledis dies.
 c. 501: Clovis's ally and brother-in-law Godegisel is murdered.
 c. 502:Clovis allies himself with the Armonici.Theuderic marries Suavegotha.
 c. 503: Clovis becomes a grandfather, when Theuderic secures a son of his own, Theudebert I.
 c. 507: Clovis liberates Aquitainia and murders various Frankish reguli.
 c. 508: Clovis baptized by the Bishop of Reims (late estimate).
 c. 509:Clovis executes the last pagan regulus.Clovis is declared the king of all the Franks.
 511 November 27 or 513: Clovis dies in Paris

References
Footnotes

Sources
 Daly, William M. (1994) "Clovis: How Barbaric, How Pagan?" Speculum, 69:3 (1994), 619–664
 James, Edward (1982) The Origins of France: Clovis to the Capetians, 500–1000. London: Macmillan, 1982
 Kaiser, Reinhold (2004) "Das römische Erbe und das Merowingerreich", in: Enzyklopädie deutscher Geschichte; 26. Munich 
 Oman, Charles (1914) The Dark Ages 476–918. London: Rivingtons
 Wallace-Hadrill, J. M. (1962) The Long-haired Kings. London

External links

|-

460s births
511 deaths
Year of birth uncertain
Frankish warriors
5th-century monarchs in Europe
Burials at the Basilica of Saint-Denis
Converts to Christianity from pagan religions
Correspondents of Ecdicius Avitus
Founding monarchs
Merovingian kings
Imperial Roman consuls
5th-century Christians
6th-century Christians
5th-century Frankish people
6th-century Frankish kings
6th-century Frankish saints
Folk saints
Military saints
5th-century Christian saints
Roman Catholic royal saints